Brian Dux (born April 7, 1981 in Orchard Park, New York) is an American professional basketball player, and formerly playing for the Guildford Heat in the British Basketball League.

College career 

Dux attended Canisius College where he starred for Golden Griffs in the MAAC, part of NCAA Division I. At Canisius, Dux picked up many awards including MAAC All-Academic Team 2001–02 and MAAC State Lottery Scholar-Athlete of the Year 2001–02.

Professional career 

Dux signed professional in 2003 when he joined Dutch team Cape Holland Den Helder in the Eredivisie. In 2005, Dux signed for Guildford Heat in their rookie season, and was included in the BBL All-Star Team for that season. In 2007, Dux lead the Heat to their first piece of silverware with an MVP performance in the BBL Cup final, on January 7, in an 81–78 win against Scottish Rocks.

Accident 
Brian Dux was seriously injured in a car accident during the early hours of Saturday 10 November 2007. No other vehicle was involved.  Brian was taken to a Surrey hospital where he remained in intensive care.

On the Saturday night, Dux was driving home at 4:40 a.m. when he lost control of his car and crashed into a tree on Bagshot Road in the town of Chobham in Surrey, England.  The arrival of an ambulance was delayed by a communications failure between local police and healthcare services. Surrey Police have launched a review into the delay. 

As of 24 November, Guildford Heat are reporting that the injuries sustained by Dux in the accident "appear to be potentially far worse than previously thought. Discussions between Dux family members and Frimley Park Hospital consultants have now taken into consideration the possibility that Brian Dux may have suffered permanent disability from his single car automobile accident." . Brain scans showed severe bleeding, damage almost certain. He might never walk again. He might be blind. He might never wake up. 

Two calls were made to ambulance services, spaced an hour apart, but it was over two hours before an ambulance arrived. The first responders, local firefighters, have been sharply critical of the delay in receiving the call out. 

On 2 December,  Brian Dux returned to the United States, after a medical jet with Prior Aviation transported him to Buffalo Niagara International Airport. Several benefit events were performed in his honour and in his support. Dux is now at Home, while going to Erie County Medical Center for rehab, less than two miles from where he became a college basketball star at Canisius.

External links 
 Guildford Heat Basketball Team

1981 births
Living people
American expatriate basketball people in the Netherlands
American expatriate basketball people in the United Kingdom
American men's basketball players
Basketball players from New York (state)
Canisius Golden Griffins men's basketball players
Surrey Scorchers players
People from Orchard Park, New York
Sportspeople from Erie County, New York